Pantang is a village in the Ga East Municipal district, a district in the Greater Accra Region of Ghana.

Village structure
The village is under the jurisdiction of the Ga East Municipal District and is in the Abokobi-Madina constituency of the Ghana parliament.

References

Accra
Populated places in the Greater Accra Region